John Murray (October 12, 1906 – June 17, 1984) was an American playwright best known for writing the 1937 play Room Service with Allen Boretz.

Murray was born in New York and attended DeWitt Clinton High School, City College of New York, and Columbia University.  His 1937 play, Room Service ran for 500 performances on Broadway and was turned into two films, the first, Room Service, starred the Marx Brothers, the second, Step Lively, starred Frank Sinatra.  The play was also adapted for two television productions.

During World War II, Murray served in the United States Army as a captain in the Signal Corps, marrying Joan Loewi in 1941.  He returned to writing for Broadway after the war, writing songs and sketches for the Ziegfeld Follies and Alive and Kicking.  Murray also began writing for the Eddie Cantor radio show and the Phil Baker radio show. Eventually, he turned to writing for television as well.

Plays

As writer
Room Service (1937)
Sing for Your Supper
Straw Hat Revue (1939)
Earl Carroll Vanities (1940)
Sticks and Stones (1940)
Ziegfeld Follies (1946)
Alive and Kicking (1950)
The Monkey Walk (1977)
Reitech (1995)

As producer
Room Service (1937)
Room Service (1953)
Charly's Aunt (1970)

Books
Fifteen Plays for Teen-Agers: A Collection of One-Act Royalty-Free Comedies and Mysteries.  T. S. Denison & Co. 1959.
Modern Monologues for Young People 1961

References

External links

1906 births
1984 deaths
United States Army personnel of World War II
American male screenwriters
Songwriters from New York (state)
Writers from New York City
20th-century American dramatists and playwrights
DeWitt Clinton High School alumni
City College of New York alumni
Columbia University alumni
American male dramatists and playwrights
20th-century American male writers
Screenwriters from New York (state)
20th-century American screenwriters
United States Army officers